Lydie Err (born 23 April 1949, in Pétange) is a Luxembourgish politician.

She was elected to the Chamber of Deputies for the Luxembourg Socialist Workers' Party (LSAP) in 1984, representing Circonscription Sud.  She was re-elected in 1989, 1994, 1999, and 2004.  From 1989 until 1991, she sat as one of the two Vice-Presidents of the Chamber.  She entered the Juncker-Poos Ministry in 1998 as a Secretary of State.  She remained for one year, before the CSV-LSAP coalition collapsed in the wake of the LSAP's 1999 election defeat.

References

Government ministers of Luxembourg
Members of the Chamber of Deputies (Luxembourg)
Members of the Chamber of Deputies (Luxembourg) from Sud
Luxembourg Socialist Workers' Party politicians
1949 births
Living people
People from Pétange
Women government ministers of Luxembourg
20th-century Luxembourgian women politicians
20th-century Luxembourgian politicians
21st-century Luxembourgian women politicians
21st-century Luxembourgian politicians